Sporting News established the Pitcher of the Year Award in 1944 to recognize the most outstanding pitchers in Major League Baseball (MLB). It was given annually (except in 1946 and 1947) to one pitcher each in the American League and National League. In 2013, the Pitcher of the Year Award was split into the Starting Pitcher of the Year Award and Relief Pitcher of the Year Award, which are given annually to a starting pitcher and relief pitchers in each league, as judged by Sporting News baseball experts.

History
By the Second World War, The Sporting News (now Sporting News), had been giving Player of the Year and Manager of the Year awards since 1936, and an annual Most Valuable Player Award since 1929.  In 1944, The Sporting News inaugurated its Pitcher of the Year Award, which has been given each year since to the most outstanding pitcher in each league, with a brief hiatus from 1946 to 1947.  Beginning in 2013, Sporting News issues two awards per league—one to the most outstanding starting pitcher, and one to the most outstanding reliever.

This award was established before there was a Cy Young Award, MLB's official honor for the best pitcher in each league. The Cy Young Award is voted by baseball writers from each city, and critics claim that the writers who follow a particular team or player throughout a season are naturally inclined to vote for him.

Three knuckleball pitchers have won the award: Joe Niekro, Wilbur Wood and R. A. Dickey.

Award firsts

In 1946, Hal Newhouser (W-L: 26–9, ERA: 1.94, Ks: 275) could have narrowly won the award or tied with Bob Feller (W-L: 26–15, ERA: 2.18, Ks: 348) based upon his statistics. It would have been Newhouser's third consecutive win, a feat not yet accomplished by an American League pitcher; however, Sporting News did not issue the award in 1946 or 1947.

In 1981, Fernando Valenzuela won three Sporting News awards: Pitcher of the Year, Rookie Pitcher of the Year, and Player of the Year.

Winners

Key

American League
Listed below in reverse chronological order are the American League pitchers chosen by Sporting News as recipients of the Pitcher of the Year Award.

American League starting pitchers

American League relief pitchers

American League pitchers

National League

Listed below in reverse chronological order are the National League pitchers chosen by Sporting News as recipients of the Pitcher of the Year Award.

National League starting pitchers

National League relief pitchers

National League pitchers

Players

Multiple wins

Several players have won the Pitcher of the Year Award more than once:
Bob Lemon was the first player to win the award 3 times.
Warren Spahn was the first to win the award 4 times and won his last award at the age of 40.
Roger Clemens was the first to win the award 5 times.
Sandy Koufax (1963–1966) and Greg Maddux (1992–1995) won the award 4 consecutive years.  
Pedro Martínez, Roy Halladay, Vida Blue, Zack Greinke, and Edwin Díaz won the award in the National League and American League.
Max Scherzer won the award 4 times, once in AL and three times in NL.

MLB Triple Crown

Only five Pitcher of the Year Award winners have led the major leagues in wins, ERA and strikeouts which is commonly called the Pitching Triple Crown. Below is a complete list including individuals before the award was created.

Sandy Koufax is the only player to achieve it more than once.  Koufax achieved it three times in a four-year period.
Hal Newhouser, age 24 and Dwight Gooden, age 20 were the youngest individuals. 
Shane Bieber, age 26 was the last player to achieve this feat.
Johan Santana, age 27, is the fifth individual. 
 Walter Johnson and Lefty Grove achieved it twice before the award began.

MLB Hall of Fame predictor

Winning three or more Pitcher of the Year Awards has been seen as a strong indicator of future admission to the Major League Baseball Hall of Fame (as active players are not eligible for the Hall of Fame). All of the eligible pitchers with three or more awards have been elected to the Hall of Fame, with one exception: Roger Clemens has the most (five) Pitcher of the Year Awards, is in the top ten for all-time wins and strikeouts, and is considered to be one of the best pitchers of all time.  Clemens' alleged use of performance-enhancing drugs is the major stumbling block to be elected to the Hall of Fame.

Starting pitchers that have won three or more Pitcher of the Year Awards and the year they were inducted into Major League Baseball Hall of Fame.  Active player statistics are through the 2022 season.

MLB Hall of Famers

MLB Hall of Famers that won the SN Pitchers of the Year award.

300 and 3,000 club members

Ten pitchers have recorded 300 wins and 3,000 strikeouts.  A list of these elite pitchers with the years they won the Pitcher of the Year Award is below.  Only two pitchers, Walter Johnson and Tom Seaver, have a career ERA below 3.00. Four pitchers have more than 4,000 career strikeouts.  Walter Johnson is the best in wins, ERA and WHIP.  Nolan Ryan has the most strikeouts.

Battle of Pitchers of the Year
It is a rare occurrence when reigning Pitcher of the Year winners face off against each other.  
A pitching duel occurred on August 28, 1989, when Frank Viola (WP: 10–15, 9IP, 5K, 3H, 0BB, 0R) of New York Mets pitched a complete-game shutout defeating Orel Hershiser (LP:14-10, 8IP, 4K, 8H, 1BB, 1ER) of the Dodgers 1–0.  
On May 9, 2013, Toronto's R. A. Dickey (6IP, 5K, 5H, 5BB, 2ER) pitched against David Price (8IP, 8K, 7H, 1BB, 2ER) of the Tampa Bay Rays.  The Rays won in 10 innings, 5–4, and neither starting pitcher got a decision.  
Arizona's Zach Greinke (WP:7-3, 11K, 7IP, 4H, 0BB, 0R) bested (3–0) Houston's Dallas Keuchel (LP:3-7, 6IP, 6K, 6H, 1BB, 3 ER) on June 2, 2016.

The lost years

The award was suspended for 1946–1947.  A list of the lost year's top two pitchers in each league based on a pitcher rating composed of wins, ERA and strikeouts is below.  A pitcher rating of 6.0 is considered very good.  A rating of 9.00 (1.5*6) is rare.  Bob Feller and Hal Newhouser in 1946 AL had a rating above 9.

Organizations
The Los Angeles Dodgers are the only organization whose pitchers have won the Pitcher of the Year Award in 5 consecutive years: 1962–1966 (Don Drysdale and Sandy Koufax) and 2013–2017 (Kershaw, Greinke and Jansen). Los Angeles (Brooklyn) Dodgers pitchers have won the award 18 times ; Atlanta (Boston and Milwaukee) Braves pitchers have won the award 13 times.  The following three (3) organizations have never had a pitcher win the award: Cincinnati Reds, Colorado Rockies, and Texas Rangers.

The Detroit Tigers have three pitchers who have won consecutive awards — Hal Newhouser (1944–1945), Denny McLain (1968–1969) and Justin Verlander (2011–2012). Each was also Player of the Year and AL MVP at least once while being Pitcher of the Year.

The Atlanta (Boston and Milwaukee) Braves also have three pitchers who have won consecutive awards — Warren Spahn (1957–1958), Greg Maddux (1992–1995) and Craig Kimbrel (2013–2014).`

See also

List of Major League Baseball awards
Sporting News MLB Player of the Year Award
Sporting News Most Valuable Player Award
Sporting News Rookie of the Year Award
Sporting News Comeback Player of the Year Award
Sporting News Reliever of the Year Award (discontinued)
Sporting News Manager of the Year Award
Sporting News Executive of the Year Award
Baseball awards

Notes
 Sutfliffe statistics are for the NL only.  His AL win–loss: 4–5, era: 5.15 and 58 strikeouts are not included.
 Max Scherzer was traded in July 2021 from Washington National to Los Angeles Dodgers.  His award is credited to both teams.

References

Major League Baseball trophies and awards

Awards by magazines
Awards established in 1944